H. oryzae may refer to:

Heterodera oryzae, a plant nematode.
Hirschmanniella oryzae, a plant nematode.
Intrasporangium oryzae, (formerly Humihabitans oryzae) a Gram-positive bacterium.